SP77 31-18 is a red supergiant or red hypergiant of the largest stars found, with a size of around 1,200 solar radii. If it replaced the Sun as the central body of the Solar System, its photosphere would engulf the orbit of Jupiter.

References

Supergiants
Extragalactic stars
Large Magellanic Cloud
TIC objects